Onamia is the name of a city and a township in Mille Lacs County, Minnesota, in the United States:

 Onamia, Minnesota
 Onamia Township, Mille Lacs County, Minnesota